Langelier is a surname. Notable people with the surname include:

Charles Langelier (1850–1920), Canadian lawyer, politician, judge, journalist, and writer
David Langelier (1883–1922), Canadian politician
François Langelier (1838–1915), Canadian lawyer, academic, journalist, politician, and writer